Giacomo Serpotta (10 March 1656 – 27 February 1732) was an Italian sculptor, active in a Rococo style and mainly working in stucco.

Biography
Serpotta was born and died in Palermo; and may have never left Sicily. His skill and facility with stucco sculpture appears to have arisen without mentorship or direct exposures to the mainstream of Italian Baroque. Rudolf Wittkower describes him as an aberrancy in an otherwise provincial scene, a "meteor in the Sicilian sky".

In 1677, along with Procopio de Ferrari, he decorated the small church of the Madonna dell’Itria in Monreale. His first independent work appears to be in 1682 in connection with an equestrian statue cast of Charles II of Spain and Sicily, which was cast in bronze by Gaspare Romano.

The Serpotta family, including his brother Giuseppe (1653–1719) and his son Procopio (1679–1755), was immensely prolific in Palermo, decorating churches and oratories. In style, he has a florid elegance that often recalls Antonio Raggi, a slightly older artist who was adept at stucco decoration and active in Rome.

For example, decorating the Oratory of San Lorenzo (1690/98–1706) with such a profusion of statuary, teeming with putti, that the walls appear to quiver with the movement of a crowd. He completed work also for the Oratory of Santa Cita; the Oratory of Rosario di San Domenico (1710–17); the Oratory of San Mercurio; the Oratory of Santa Caterina, adjacent to the church of the Olivella; and the chapel for the Ospedale di Palermo.  His work at the oratory of the Compagna della Carità di San Bartolomeo degli Incurabili in Palermo has been lost.

His stucco work for the oratories follows a general formula, but each elaboration is its individual tour de force. Two of the oratories are dedicated to the rosary, and the wall is divided into a series of tableaux or dioramas, each matching a Mystery of the Rosary, above these are allegorical figures or a fecundity of cherubs in playful frolic. The tableux develops a program of prayer images, like a via crucis for contemplative prayer. The Santa Cita oratory is remarkable for its dioramas, coupled with almost genre like figures calling our attention from the moldings on which they perch. Between the doors entering the oratory is a remarkably detailed depiction of a naval battle, referencing the Battle of Lepanto. In the frames above and below are a trophy of arms, including helmets and body armor, and a Hapsburg eagle spreads its wings.

He also decorated the Archbishop's Palace in Santa Chiara; the Badia Nuova; and the Saints Cosmas and Damian's Church in Alcamo.

Gallery

References

Sources
 
 
 Web Gallery of Art Biography
 Donald Garstang: Giacomo Serpotta and the Stuccatori of Palermo 1560-1790

External links 

 Photos of stuccoes by Giacomo Serpotta on Wondersofsicily.com

1652 births
1732 deaths
Artists from Palermo
Italian Baroque sculptors
17th-century Italian sculptors
Italian male sculptors
18th-century Italian sculptors
Rococo sculptors
Catholic sculptors
18th-century Italian male artists